The Glove Theatre is a historic theater located at 42 North Main Street in Gloversville, New York, that now houses regional theatrical shows.

It opened in 1914 as an 800-seat theater to present live performances including vaudeville shows, orchestral concerts, and opera. It was designed in 1913 by Linn Kinne of Utica for Cady & Dartch.  The marquee was added in 1939.

After the theater's heyday in the 1950s, it presented films, and then closed in the 1970s. In 1995, a plan arose to tear the theater down to become a parking lot, but community action stopped this from happening, and volunteers have run the theater since then.

References

External links 
 Official website

Theatres in New York (state)
1914 establishments in New York (state)
Regional theatre in the United States